William Edwin Marshall (1 October 1898 – 14 November 1966) was an English professional footballer who played as a winger.

References

1898 births
1966 deaths
Footballers from Birmingham, West Midlands
English footballers
Association football wingers
Rotax Works F.C. players
Chesterfield F.C. players
Grimsby Town F.C. players
Reading F.C. players
Boston Town F.C. players
English Football League players